The following lists events that happened during 1960 in South Vietnam.

Events

December
 December 20 - The National Liberation Front (NLF) was created as a Communist political organization in South Vietnam, to oppose the government of President Ngo Dinh Diem, who gave the group the nickname "Viet Cong". As the NLF gained adherents, it began carrying out military attacks against the South Vietnamese Army, and against U.S. forces during the Vietnam War.

References

 
Years of the 20th century in South Vietnam
1960s in South Vietnam
South Vietnam
South
South Vietnam